Spier is a hamlet in the Dutch province of Drenthe. It is located in the municipality of Midden-Drenthe, about 11 km north of Hoogeveen.

In 2001, the hamlet of Spier had 91 inhabitants. The built-up area of the hamlet was 0.036 km2, and contained 35 residences.
The statistical area "Spier", which can also include the surrounding countryside, has a population of around 370.

References

Midden-Drenthe
Populated places in Drenthe